Señorita Panamá 2004, the 22nd Señorita Panamá pageant and 39th celebration of the Miss Panama contest, was held in Teatro Nacional de Panamá, Ciudad de Panamá, Panama, on September 11, 2004, after weeks of events. The winner of the pageant was Rosa María Hernández.

The pageant was broadcast live on RPC-TV Panamá. About 12 contestants from all over Panamá competed for the prestigious crown. At the conclusion of the final night of competition, outgoing titleholder Señorita Panamá 2003 Jessica Rodríguez of Panama Centro crowned Rosa María Hernández of Los Santos as the new Señorita Panamá.

Hernández competed in the 54th edition of the Miss Universe 2005 pageant, at the Impact Arena, Bangkok, Thailand on May 31, 2005.

Final Result

Special awards

Judges
Daniel Machado - photographer
Catherine Correia - actress

Contestants 
These are the competitors who have been selected this year.

Election schedule

 Friday May 28 presentation to the press in the Hotel Radisson Decapolis
 Friday September 10, National Costume election.
 Thursday September 11 Final night, coronation Señorita Panamá 2004

Candidates notes

 Mayte Sánchez González won Miss International Panamá 2006 and participate in the Miss International 2006 in Tokyo, Japan & Beijing, China finals was held on November 11, 2006 at Beijing Exhibition Centre, Beijing, China. She was the First Runner Up.
 Rosmery Isabel Suárez competed in Miss Earth 2005 in Quezon City, Philippines.
 Ingrid González was named Miss Panamá Earth 2004 but did not compete in Miss Earth 2004.
 Ana Isabel Ibáñez was Miss Hawaiian Tropic Panamá  2002.
 Mercy Correia participated in Miss Caraibes Hibiscus.
 Julianna Barriga competed in the Miss Florida Teen USA.

References

External links
  Señorita Panamá  official website

Señorita Panamá
2004 beauty pageants